Brett Hillyer (born April 16, 1986) is an American politician from Ohio. Hillyer is a Republican Party member of the Ohio House of Representatives, representing the 51st district since 2019. Hillyer's district includes all of Tuscarawas County and half of Holmes County.

Career 
Hillyer previously served as the city prosecutor and law director for Uhrichsville, Ohio. He is a graduate of the University of Akron and Ohio Northern University. As a city prosecutor, Hillyer was influential in setting up Land banking in his area.

In 2018, state Representatives Al Landis was unable to run for another term due to term limits, leaving the seat vacant.  In a crowded Republican primary, Hillyer won the Republican nomination over four other candidates. In November 2018, Hillyer won the election and became a Republican Party member of the Ohio House of Representatives, representing the 98th district.

Personal life 
Hillyer's wife is Anna Hillyer. Hillyer and his family live in Uhrichsville, Ohio.

References

External links 
 Representative Brett Hudson Hillyer (official site)

1986 births
Living people
21st-century American politicians
Republican Party members of the Ohio House of Representatives
Ohio Northern University alumni
University of Akron alumni